Mr. Jordan is the third studio album by singer-songwriter Julian Lennon. It was Lennon's first album in three years, after taking a hiatus from the music industry.

Release 

It was released in March 1989 on Virgin Records. The album title is a reference to the film Here Comes Mr. Jordan (1941).

The album did poorly in the album charts, but the lead single, the David Bowie sounding  "Now You're in Heaven", reached number one on the Billboard Album Rock Tracks chart.

Cash Box said that "Lennon explores his lower vocal range" in the single "You're the One."

The album was reissued, along with The Secret Value of Daydreaming and Help Yourself, on 8 September 2009 by Noble Rot Records.

Track listing 
All songs written by Julian Lennon and John McCurry, except where noted.

Side one
 "Now You're In Heaven" – 3:39
 "You're the One" – 5:52
 "I Get Up" – 4:38
 "Mother Mary" (Lennon) – 4:56
 "Angillette" – 4:23

Side two
"Open Your Eyes" (Lennon) – 4:22
 "Make It Up to You" (Lennon, Patrick Leonard) – 4:46
 "Sunday Morning" (Lennon) – 3:27
 "Second Time" (Justin Clayton, Lennon) – 5:14
 "I Want You to Know" – 5:45

German exclusive bonus track
"Johnny B. Goode" (Berry) – 1:24
Track 11, exclusive to German CD pressings.

Personnel

Musicians 
 Julian Lennon – lead vocals, backing vocals (1, 2, 4, 5, 6, 8, 9, 10), keyboards (1–4, 6–10), acoustic piano (5)
 Patrick Leonard – keyboards (1–4, 6–10), drum programming (1), synthesizers (5), Hammond B3 organ (7, 9), Yamaha CP-70 electric grand piano (9)
 Jai Winding – keyboards (1, 2, 3, 7, 9, 10)
 Justin Clayton – guitar (1, 2, 3, 7, 9, 10), lead guitar (4)
 John McCurry – guitar (1, 3, 4, 5, 9), guitar solo (2, 7, 10)
 Dann Huff – guitar (2, 6, 10)
 David Williams – backing vocals (2), guitar (6)
 Bruce Gaitsch – acoustic guitar (8, 9)
 Peter Frampton – guitar solo (9), backing vocals (9)
 Schuyler Deale – bass (1, 2, 3, 7, 9, 10)
 Jonathan Moffett – drums (1–4, 6, 7, 9, 10), backing vocals (2)
 Luis Conte – percussion (1, 4, 9, 10)
 Vinnie Colaiuta – brushes (3)
 Warren Ham – harmonica solo (3)
 Frank Elmo – saxophone (3, 7, 10)
 Chuck Findley – trumpet (3, 8)
 Larry Corbett – cello (4, 6)
 Suzie Katayama – cello (4, 6)
 Daniel Smith – cello (4, 6)
 John Yoakum – English horn (8)
 Fee Waybill – backing vocals (1, 6, 10) 
 Alexandra Brown – backing vocals (3, 7)
 Carmen Carter – backing vocals (3, 7)
 Niki Haris – backing vocals (3, 6, 7, 9, 10)
 Donna De Lory – backing vocals (6)
 Fiona Flanagan – backing vocals (6, 9, 10)
 Marilyn Martin – backing vocals (6)
 Timothy B. Schmit – backing vocals (9)

Production 
 Patrick Leonard – producer 
 Brian Malouf – engineer, mixing 
 Greg Droman – assistant engineer 
 Ian Eales – assistant engineer
 Rick Holbrook – assistant engineer
 Patrick MacDougall – assistant engineer
 Michael Vail Blum – assistant engineer
 Stephen Marcussen – mastering 
 John Good – drum technician 
 Ivy Skoff – production manager 
 Bob Defrin – art direction 
 Mark English – artwork 
 Julian Lennon – design concept
 Timothy White – photography 
 Tony Smith – management 
 Patrick "Paddy" Spinks – management

Studios
 Recorded at Johnny Yuma Recording (Los Angeles, California).
 Mixed at Skip Saylor Recording (Los Angeles, California).
 Mastered at Precision Mastering (Hollywood, California).

Music videos 
 "Now You're In Heaven" – The first single and video made to promote Mr. Jordan. The song became a hit on the Album Rock chart in the US where it hit number 1.
 "You're the One" – The second single and last video to be made to promote Mr. Jordan. The single failed to chart, but the "Radio Mix" differs from the album version.

Chart positions

References

External links 
 
 Album information

1989 albums
Julian Lennon albums
Albums produced by Patrick Leonard
Atlantic Records albums
Virgin Records albums